David Philip Clapham (17 May 1931 in Rawmarsh, Yorkshire, UK – 22 October 2005) was a racing driver and motor sport journalist from South Africa.

Career
Clapham participated at many levels of motor sport in South Africa, including Formula Vee, Formula Ford and saloon car racing, as well as the South African Formula One Championship. He was instrumental in bringing Formula Vee and Formula Ford to South Africa, and helped Jody Scheckter move to Europe where he got his big break into international motorsport.

He took part in the Formula One Rand Grand Prix in 1963 and 1964, blowing the engine of his Cooper in the latter. He had entered the 1965 South African Grand Prix two weeks later, but he withdrew the entry before the meeting took place.

Clapham also wrote articles and columns in the South African motor sport press, both during and after his racing career, and later remained in the sport in various administrative capacities.  He died in 2005 after a short illness, leaving behind his wife Margaret, son Jeremy and daughter Bridget.

Results

Complete Formula One World Championship results
(key)

Non-Championship Formula One results
(key)

References

South African racing drivers
South African Formula One drivers
English emigrants to South Africa
1931 births
2005 deaths